"The Clockwork Atom Bomb" is a 2005 science fiction short story by British writer Dominic Green. It was first published in Interzone.

Plot summary

Mativi is a weapons inspector for the United Nations, whose mission to Kinshasa is hindered by the local residents' insistence that his actions will disrupt their economy.

Reception

"The Clockwork Atom Bomb" won the 2005 Interzone readers' poll as the most popular story of the year, and was a finalist for the 2006 Hugo Award for Best Short Story. It was also included in the 23rd edition of The Year's Best Science Fiction, a collection of outstanding science fiction short stories edited by Gardner Dozois.

References

Science fiction short stories
2005 short stories
Works originally published in Interzone (magazine)
2000s science fiction works